Kalasipalya is a 2004 Indian Kannada romantic action film directed by Om Prakash Rao. It was produced by Ramu under his Ramu Films banner. The film stars Darshan and Rakshita. The music is composed by Venkat-Narayan and Sadhu Kokila. The director had revealed that he had copied scenes from seven movies -  predominantly from the Tamil movie Dhool including its comedy sequences while other sequences were partially inspired by the Hindi movie Vaastav  and the opening sequence from Kaakha Kaakha.

Plot 
Kencha is presented as a local in Kalasipalya. He spends time with his friends, playing cricket and getting into fights. Kencha lives with his father Seetharam, mother Janaki and little sister Anitha. Seetharam berates Kencha for not completing his SSLC Exam and not having an aim in life. Kencha meets his neighbour Priya, who falls in love with him. Meanwhile, Kalasipalyam is ruled by gangsters Kota Prabhakar, Munna Bhai and his brother Jaleel. Munna Bhai and Jaleel use their syndicate network to support their mentor MLA Krishnappa. Kencha thrashes Kota Prabhakar and his henchman when they threaten to pour acid on Anitha. In Election day, Kencha thrashes Jaleel when he threatens everyone to vote for Krishnappa and also harasses Priya.

Munna Bhai finds out and creates a ruckus at Kencha's house, making Kencha withdraw a complaint. Kencha decides to start an eatery business with his friends. His parents are happy about his decision and extend their support. The business seems to be working out until Jaleel and his men start visiting their stall. Continuously for some days Jaleel's drunken men visit the stall and abuse Kencha's friend. Kencha tells his friend to not get involved in any argument with them. One night, Jaleel beats up Kencha's friend badly. Unable to keep emotions and anger in check, Kencha accidentally kills Jaleel and goes into hiding with his friends. Munna Bhai barges into Kencha's house and kills Seetharam, Janaki and Anitha, seeking revenge.

Enraged, Kencha goes to Munna Bhai's liquor factory and a fight erupts where Kencha is struck and stabbed by Munna Bhai, Krishnappa and SI Karunakar. They throw him in a lake. Kencha's friends and Priya find him and get him treated at Arya Vaidya Sala. He heals and plans to eliminate the terror of Munna Bhai. He kills Karunakar and Krishnappa. The latter's death is witnessed by the Police commissioner. Kencha goes to Munna Bhai's liquor factory where he, along with his friends kill the henchmen, chase Munna Bhai and brutally kill him, thus ending his terror and avenging his family's death. Kencha surrenders to the commissioner, but is not arrested, because he had killed only gangsters. Kencha and his friends form a vigilance group and punish the gangsters.

Cast
Darshan as Kencha
Rakshita as Priya 
Ananthavelu as MLA Krishnappa
Mohan Raj as Munna Bhai 
G. V. Sudhakar Naidu as Jaleel, Munna Bhai's brother
Rajashekhar Kotian as SI Karunakar
Avinash as Seetharam, Kencha's father
Chitra Shenoy as Janaki, Kencha's mother
Anitha as Anitha, Kencha's sister
Raju Ananthaswamy, Kencha's friend
Sadhu Kokila as Jacky
Bullet Prakash as Govinda 
Ramesh Bhat as Priya's father
Shailaja Joshi as Priya's mother
Sunitha Shetty 
Kote Prabhakar as Kota Prabhakar
M. N. Lakshmi Devi
Tharakesh Patel as Gilli 
Sai Prakash 
Kempe Gowda 
Srinivas Murthy as police commissioner 
Stunt Siddu 
John 
Ramesh Pandith 
Escorts Srinivas
Badri Narayan 
Guru Murthy 
Venkata Rao 
Ramesh Babu 
Srinivas Prabhu

Soundtrack
All the songs were composed and scored by Venkat-Narayan and Sadhu Kokila. The song "Suntaragaali" was recreated from the Tamil song "Manmatha Rasa" from the film Thiruda Thirudi.

References

External links
Movie review

2004 films
2000s Kannada-language films
Indian action films
Kannada remakes of Tamil films
Films directed by Om Prakash Rao
2004 action films